"Please Don't Go" is a 2015 song by an Australian singer songwriter Joel Adams. The song was released on 2 November 2015  and has peaked at number 55 in Australia. This is Joel Adams' debut single. The song charted all over the world, proving especially successful in Sweden where it peaked at #6 and Norway at #11.  

“Please Don’t Go” is the theme song of 2019 Brat series Zoe Valentine.

Background
In an interview with Girl.com.au, Joel said; "I wrote the song 4 years ago when I was fifteen at school. I remember it was performance week and each student had to write an original song and sing it for the class, but I had totally forgotten. So, I grabbed a guitar, sat down on some stairs about an hour before it was my go and just started frantically strumming chords and came up with all the melodies in about 12 minutes and then went in a few minutes later and pretty much winged it! I ended up finishing the song after that night and kind of kept it in my pocket until the right time came to jump in the studio and produce it."

Critical reception
Mark Papadotos from Digital Journal said; "Overall, Joel Adams showcases a great deal of talent and charisma on "Please Don't Go." One can easily tell that he sings from the heart, and he maintains great control over his voice. His tone is crystalline and his lyrics are warm. He deserves to make it big in the contemporary pop music scene. His single garners an A rating."

Performance 
Joel performed "Please Don't Go" live on The Morning Show on 1 April 2016.

Joel performed "Please Don't Go - Live Studio Performance on his YouTube Channel "Joel Adams" on 12 March 2021.

Music video
The official music video was directed by Chuong Vo and released on 23 December 2015. As of April 2022, the video had earned over 105 million views and 2 million likes.

Track listings

Charts

Weekly charts

Year-end charts

Certifications

Release history

References

2015 songs
2015 singles